Minangkabau Culture Documentation and Information Center (or PDIKM) is a museum and research center for Minangkabau culture, located in the city of Padang Panjang, West Sumatra, Indonesia. The center building is in the form of a Minangkabau traditional house (rumah gadang), with a large garden that slopes up to the main gate.

Establishment 
The center was initiated by Bustanil Arifin and Abdul Hamid, in which the laying of the first stone began on August 8, 1988 and was formalized since December 19, 1990.

Collections 
The West Sumatran cultural collections that can be seen in this place include:
 Photographs of various regional wedding dresses
 Photographs of traditional leaders and matriarchs
 Photographs of national figures from the local origin
 Photographs of various types of traditional houses
 Photographs of historical objects from the ancient kingdom of Pagaruyung
 Books on Minangkabau which were published before 1942
 Ancient texts of Minangkabau
 Collection of newspaper clippings and microfilms
 Tapes of classic Minangkabau stories
 Replicas of traditional musical instruments

See also 
 Adityawarman Museum

References 

Museums in West Sumatra
1990 establishments in Indonesia
Padang Panjang